Rankin County is one of the 141 Cadastral divisions of New South Wales. It includes part of the Paroo-Darling National Park. The border to the north-west is the Darling River.

Rankin County was named after Rankin Range – Mount Rankin which is in Bathurst, New South Wales.

Parishes within this county
A full list of parishes found within this county; their current LGA and mapping coordinates to the approximate centre of each location is as follows:

References

Counties of New South Wales